The 1996 United States presidential election in Mississippi took place on November 5, 1996. All fifty states and the District of Columbia, were part of the 1996 United States presidential election. Mississippi voters chose seven electors to the Electoral College, which selected the president and vice president. Mississippi was won by the Republican nominee, Kansas Senator Bob Dole, who was running against incumbent Democrat President Bill Clinton of Arkansas. Clinton ran a second time with former Tennessee Senator Al Gore as Vice President, and Dole ran with former New York Congressman Jack Kemp.

Mississippi weighed in for this election as 13.5% more Republican than the national average. The presidential election of 1996 was a very multi-partisan election for Mississippi's standards, with almost seven percent of the electorate voting for third-party candidates. During this election, the vast majority of counties in Mississippi voted in majority for the Republican candidate, with the notable exceptions of Jackson’s highly populated Hinds County and a Democratic stronghold of counties bordering the Mississippi River, which have tended to vote Democratic.

In his second bid for the presidency, Ross Perot led the newly reformed Reform Party to gain over 5% of the votes in Mississippi, and to pull in support nationally as the most popular third-party candidate to run for United States Presidency in recent times. , this is the last election in which the following counties voted for a Democratic presidential candidate: Alcorn, Amite, Lawrence, Walthall, and Montgomery.

This is the closest a Democrat has come to winning the state since Jimmy Carter's slim defeat in 1980.

Results

Results by county

See also
 Presidency of Bill Clinton

References

Mississippi
1996
1996 Mississippi elections